The Copa León Peyrou was a Uruguayan football cup competition organized by the Uruguayan Football Association from 1919 to 1922, named after the leader of the old River Plate FC and President of the AUF since 1920.

The tournament was held during the last months of the year. All the clubs of the Uruguayan Primera División participated and it had a knockout format.

After the first edition won by Universal, Nacional won the next three competitions, obtaining the cup as its own.

List of champions

Titles by club

References

H
Recurring sporting events established in 1919
1919 establishments in Uruguay